Lipinia microcerca, also known as the banded lipinia, Sipora striped skink, or common striped skink, is a species of skink. It is found in southern Vietnam, Cambodia, and southern Laos; its range might extend into Thailand and eastern Myanmar. Until a recent (2019) revision, it was considered a subspecies of Lipinia vittigera.

References

Lipinia
Lizards of Asia
Reptiles of Cambodia
Reptiles of Laos
Reptiles of Vietnam
Reptiles described in 1901
Taxa named by Oskar Boettger